Richard Tomlins may refer to:

 Richard Tomlins (politician) (1563–1650), Member of Parliament for Ludlow
 Richard Tomlins (merchant) (1564?–1650), founder of the Readership in Anatomy at Oxford
 Richard Tomlins (judge) (died after 1660), Baron of the Exchequer 1649–1660